The 1987 Burkina Faso coup d'état was a bloody military coup in Burkina Faso, which took place on 15 October 1987. The coup was organized by Captain Blaise Compaoré against incumbent far-left President Captain Thomas Sankara, his former friend and associate during the 1983 upheaval.

Compaoré has never acknowledged that a coup has taken place and claims to be a Sankara loyalist.

Events
Sankara was killed by an armed group with twelve other officials, in a gun battle at the presidential palace. Immediately, Compaoré assumed the presidency; he cited deterioration in relations with neighbouring countries as one of the reasons for the coup, and stated that Sankara jeopardised foreign relations with former colonial power France and neighbouring Ivory Coast.

Aftermath
Following the coup and although Sankara was known to be dead, some CDRs (formed by Sankara, inspired by the CDRs in Cuba) mounted an armed resistance to the military for several days.

Compaoré described the killing of Sankara as an "accident", but the circumstances have never been properly investigated. Sankara's body was dismembered and he was buried in an unmarked grave while his widow Mariam and two children fled the nation. The 2015 autopsy had revealed that Sankara's body was "riddled" with "more than a dozen" bullets, as reported by one of the lawyers representing Mariam Sankara.

Compaoré introduced a policy of "rectification", immediately reversed the nationalizations, overturned nearly all of Sankara's leftist and Third Worldist policies, and rejoined the International Monetary Fund and World Bank to bring in "desperately needed" funds to restore the "shattered" economy.

Initially ruling in a triumvirate under the Popular Front with Major Jean-Baptiste Boukary Lingani and Captain Henri Zongo, in September 1989 Compaoré had these two arrested, charged with plotting to overthrow the government, summarily tried, and executed. Compaoré went on to rule the country until he was ousted in the 2014 Burkinabé uprising.

Liberian involvement 
Prince Johnson,  a former Liberian warlord allied to Charles Taylor also known for supervising the assassination of president Samuel Doe, told the Liberian Truth and Reconciliation Commission that the coup was organized by Taylor.

References

See also
 History of Burkina Faso

Coup
1980s coups d'état and coup attempts
Conflicts in 1987
1987
October 1987 events in Africa